The Antiguan Records in Swimming are the fastest times ever swum by a swimmer representing Antigua and Barbuda. These records are kept/maintained by the Antigua and Barbuda Swimming Federation (ABSF). Records are recognized for long course (50m) and short course (25m) in the following events:
freestyle: 50, 100, 200, 400, 800 and 1500;
backstroke: 50, 100 and 200;
breaststroke: 50, 100 and 200;
butterfly: 50, 100 and 200;
Individual medley: 100 (short course only), 200 and 400;

Long course (50m)

Men

|-bgcolor=#DDDDDD
|colspan=9|
|-

|-bgcolor=#DDDDDD
|colspan=9|
|-

|-bgcolor=#DDDDDD
|colspan=9|
|-

|-bgcolor=#DDDDDD
|colspan=9|
|-

|-bgcolor=#DDDDDD
|colspan=9|
|-

Women

|-bgcolor=#DDDDDD
|colspan=9|
|-

|-bgcolor=#DDDDDD
|colspan=9|
|-

|-bgcolor=#DDDDDD
|colspan=9|
|-

|-bgcolor=#DDDDDD
|colspan=9|
|-

|-bgcolor=#DDDDDD
|colspan=9|
|-

Short course (25m)

Men

|-bgcolor=#DDDDDD
|colspan=9|
|-

|-bgcolor=#DDDDDD
|colspan=9|
|-

|-bgcolor=#DDDDDD
|colspan=9|
|-

|-bgcolor=#DDDDDD
|colspan=9|
|-

Women

|-bgcolor=#DDDDDD
|colspan=9|
|-

|-bgcolor=#DDDDDD
|colspan=9|
|-

|-bgcolor=#DDDDDD
|colspan=9|
|-

|-bgcolor=#DDDDDD
|colspan=9|
|-

Mixed relay

References
General
Antiguan Records 26 June 2022 updated
Specific

External links
ABSF official website

Antigua and Barbuda
records
Swimming
Swimming